The 2006 Ontario Scott Tournament of Hearts was held January 30-February 4 at the Fort Frances Curling Club in Fort Frances, Ontario.  Krista Scharf's rink from Thunder Bay, Ontario won her first provincial title.

Teams

Standings

External links
Web Archive - 2006 Ontario Scott Tournament of Hearts

2006 in Canadian curling
Ontario Scotties Tournament of Hearts